The Banishing is a 2020 British horror film directed by Christopher Smith, starring Jessica Brown Findlay, John Heffernan, John Lynch and Sean Harris. It premiered at the Sitges Film Festival and London FrightFest Film Festival in October 2020, before being released digitally in the United Kingdom on 26 March 2021.

Plot
In 1935 England, a vicar living in Morley Hall murders his wife in a fit of jealousy and then takes his own life. Bishop Malachi asks the town physician to cover up the crime. Three years later, the new vicar, Linus Forster, moves into Morley Hall with his new wife Marianne and her young daughter Adelaide, who was born out of wedlock and masquerades as her niece. The couple's relationship becomes strained due Linus's struggle with intimacy, which he perceives as a sin. Meanwhile, Adelaide starts experiencing supernatural occurrences in the house. She's seen playing with strange dolls in the shape of monks and talking to invisible people. The mirrors in the house give delayed reflections, and soon Marianne starts to have unsettling hallucinations of shadowy figures, as well as premonitions, including the violent death of their deaf housekeeper Betsy. Marianne also relives traumatic memories of a time when she was institutionalized in a mental asylum during her pregnancy.

Occultist Harry Reed, who has extensively investigated the house's sinister history, warns Linus about it. The site originally hosted a monastery of the Minassian Order, which performed dark rituals and used torture to punish those who were deemed sinners. Bishop Malachi strongly objects to Harry's interference and openly threatens him. Harry answers denouncing Malachi's Nazi sympathies in public. Malachi arranges for Harry to be assaulted by two thugs under his service.

Marianne is encouraged by Betsy to meet with Harry, who's wounded but still refuses to leave. Harry warns Marianne that the house will turn its residents against one another, so the family should leave for their own safety. Back at the house, Linus is investigating his predecessor's death and discovers Malachi had lied to him, claiming the previous vicar and his family had moved to Australia. He also experiences a supernatural vision of Marianne committing adultery. This prompts a jealous argument between him and Marianne, particularly after he discovers that she has met with Harry. The following day, Marianne receives a visit from Malachi. He reveals to have been the one who returned Adelaide to her, after Adelaide was sent to an orphanage as a baby while Marianne was in the mental hospital. He also orchestrated Marianne's meeting with Linus and his current posting at Morley Hall. Malachi threatens to use his power to again take Adelaide away from Marianne if she were to try to leave the house.

Marianne's relationship with Adelaide grows increasingly sour, as the child has begun to talk to an unseen figure she claims is her real mother. The child then goes missing after walking into a mirror. Marianne unsuccessfully tries to seek help from a drunk Linus before approaching Harry, who agrees to help her. When they return to the house, they find that Betsy has been murdered by the now-possessed Linus, who is now in a trance. The murder scene is the same from Marianne's vision. Harry is able to pull Linus back to lucidity and explains that Adelaide has been abducted by the spirit of a pregnant woman who was murdered by the Minassian monks, as she was carrying their child. Linus performs a ritual from a book he retrieved among the previous vicar's possessions, to help Marianne retrieve Adelaide and confront the spirits haunting the house. Marianne is forced to experience nightmarish visions, some of which are related to her past, during which she proclaims that she is unashamed of what she has done. She manages to find and retrieve Adelaide, promising the murdered woman that they will give her and the unborn child a proper burial. They make good on their promise, however Bishop Malachi is shown at some later point digging up the bodies and delivering them to Nazi officials in Stuttgart.

Cast 
 Jessica Brown Findlay as Marianne
John Heffernan as Linus
John Lynch as Malachi
 Sean Harris as Harry Reed, inspired to real occultist Harry Price
 Anya McKenna-Bruce as Adelaide

Production 
The Banishing was announced in September 2017, with UK-based The Fyzz Facility revealed to be financing it and WestEnd Films to produce. It was introduced at the 2017 Toronto International Film Festival. Jessica Brown Findlay and Sean Harris were revealed to be starring in October 2018, and principal photography began on 5 November 2018.

Release 
The film premiered at the 2020 Sitges Film Festival in Spain on 12 October 2020, and then in the United Kingdom at the London FrightFest Film Festival on 22 October, where it impressed critics. It was then released across the United Kingdom on premium video-on-demand services by Vertigo Releasing, on 26 March 2021.

References

External links
 

2020 horror films
2020s ghost films
2020s supernatural horror films
British ghost films
British supernatural horror films
Films directed by Christopher Smith
Films set in 1935
Films set in 1938
Films set in England
Films set in Baden-Württemberg
Films about Catholic priests
Uxoricide in fiction
2020s British films